This is a list of currently active separatist movements in Europe. Separatism often refers to full political secession, though separatist movements may seek nothing more than greater autonomy or to be recognised as a national minority.

What is and is not considered an autonomist or secessionist movement is sometimes contentious. Entries on this list must meet three criteria:
 They are active movements with active members;
 They are seeking greater autonomy or self-determination for a geographic region (as opposed to personal autonomy);
 They are citizens/people of the conflict area and do not come from another country.

Under each region listed is one or more of the following:
 De facto state (de facto entity): for unrecognized regions with de facto autonomy;
 Proposed state: proposed name for a seceding sovereign state;
 Proposed autonomous area: for movements towards greater autonomy for an area but not outright secession;
 De facto autonomous government: for governments with de facto autonomous control over a region;
 Government-in-exile: for a government based outside of the region in question, with or without control;
 Political party (or parties): for political parties involved in a political system to push for autonomy or secession;
 Militant organisation(s): for armed organisations;
 Advocacy group(s): for non-belligerent, non-politically participatory entities;
 Ethnic/ethno-religious/racial/regional/religious group(s).

Various ethnic groups in Europe are seeking greater autonomy or independence. In the European Union (EU), several of these groups are members of the European Free Alliance (EFA). In some cases, the group seeks to unify into a different state – in cases where this does not involve the creation of a new state entity, this is considered to be irredentism. Analogous irredentist movements are included in the list of active irredentist movements.

Azerbaijan 

Territory of the former  Nagorno-Karabakh Autonomous Oblast

 People: Armenians in Azerbaijan
 De facto state:  (recognised by 3 non-UN members)
 Proposed: recognition of Artsakh status based on self-determination principle
 Political organisation: National Assembly
 Military organisation: Artsakh Defense Army

Territory of the short-lived  Talysh-Mughan Autonomous Republic
 People: Talysh people
 Proposed: Talysh province with regional administration within the borders of Azerbaijan
 Political organisation: Talysh National Movement
 Government in exile:  Talysh-Mughan Autonomous Republic
Lezgistan

 Ethnic group: Lezgins
 Proposed: Autonomy or outright independence for  Lezgistan
 Political organisation: Sadval movement, Federal Lezgian National and Cultural Autonomy

Belgium

Autonomist movements

 People: Germans
 Autonomous area: Eastern Belgium
 Political parties: ProDG (former EFA member), Party for Freedom and Progress, Christian Social Party

 
 People: Flemish
 Autonomous area: Flanders
 Movements: Flemish Movement

 People: Walloons
 Autonomous area: Wallonia
 Movements: Walloon Movement

Secessionist movements

 or Flemish Community (the latter includes )

 People: Flemish
 Proposed state: , unification with the 
 Political parties: New Flemish Alliance (member of the European Free Alliance), Libertair, Direct, Democratisch, Vlaams Belang and Flemish-Socialist Movement
 Movements: Vlaamse Volksbeweging (VVB), Taal Aktie Komitee and Voorpost

 or French Community of Belgium (the latter includes )

 People: Walloons
 Proposed state:  Wallonia, unification with 
 Political parties: Walloon Rally, Rassemblement Wallonie France

Bosnia and Herzegovina

Secessionist movements

 People: Serbs of Bosnia and Herzegovina
 Proposed: unification with 
 Political organisation: National Assembly of Republika Srpska (Government of Republika Srpska)
 Political parties: Alliance of Independent Social Democrats, Serbian Democratic Party

Autonomist movements
 Croatian Community of Herzeg-Bosnia

 People: Croats of Bosnia and Herzegovina
 Proposed state: , as a refounded third entity of Bosnia-Herzegovina
 Political organisation: Croatian National Assembly of Bosnia and Herzegovina
 Political parties: Croatian Democratic Union of Bosnia and Herzegovina, Croatian Democratic Union 1990, Croatian Christian Democratic Union

Croatia 

Autonomist movements
 Istria County

 People: Istrians (Croats, Istrian Italians, Istro-Romanians, and Istriot-speakers)
 Proposed: Autonomy for  Istria within Croatia
 Political party: Istrian Democratic Assembly (factions, not officially)

Cyprus 

The northeastern 1/3 territory of island of Cyprus
 People: Turkish Cypriots
 De facto state:  (recognized only by Turkey)
 Political organisation: Government of Northern Cyprus
 Militant organisation: Security Forces Command

Czech Republic

Autonomist movements

 Moravia
 People: Moravian
 Proposed autonomous area:  Moravia
 Political party: Moravané (former EFA member), Moravian land movement (EFA member)
 Organisation: Moravian National Community

Denmark 

 People: Faroese
 Proposed state: 
 Political parties: Republican Party, Progress, People's Party, Centre Party, Self-Government Party
 Movement: Faroese independence movement
Minor Movements

 Bornholm
 Proposed state:  Bornholm
 Proposed autonomous area: Bornholm
 Political party: Bornholm's Self-Government Party

Finland

 People: Åland Swedes
 Proposed state: 
 Political party: Future of Åland (EFA member)

France

Secessionist movements

 People: Alsatians (Allemanics)
 Proposed state:  or unification with Germany
 Political parties: Elsass Zuerst, Unser Land (EFA member)

 French Basque Country

 People: Basque
 Proposed state: unification with the  Basque Country and  – Euskal Herria
 Political parties: Abertzaleen Batasuna (AB), Eusko Alkartasuna (EFA member), Euzko Alderdi Jeltzalea (Basque Nationalist Party).
 Trade unions: Euskal Langileen Alkartasuna, Langile Abertzaleen Batzordeak
 Youth advocacy groups: Gazte Abertzaleak, Segi
 Militant organisations: Irrintzi

 Historic Brittany, comprising Brittany (administrative region) and parts of 

 People: Bretons
 Proposed state: 
 Advocacy groups: Celtic League
 Political parties: Breton Democratic Union, Adsav, Strollad Breizh, Emgann
 Militant organisation: Talbenn Dieubiñ Breizh (Breton Revolutionary Army) (ARB)

 People: Corsicans
 Proposed state:  or unification with Italy
 Political party: Corsica Libera, Pè a Corsica
 Militant group: National Liberation Front of Corsica

 Occitania

 People: Occitans
 Proposed state:  Occitania
 Political parties: Partit de la Nacion Occitana
 Political movement: Assemblada Occitana, Libertat

 French Flanders

 People: Flemings
 Political party: Flemish movement

 People: Provençals (Occitans)
 Proposed state:  Provence
 Militant group: Front Nacionala Liberacion de Provença

 Northern Catalonia
 People: Northern Catalans
 Political parties: Esquerra Republicana- Catalunya del Nord, Oui au Pays Catalan (autonomist)
 Advocacy organisations: Catalunya Nord per la independència, Òmnium Catalunya Nord
 Youth organisations: Joventuts d'Esquerra Republicana (Catalunya Nord)

 Etat Pied-Noir
 Ethnic group: Pieds-Noirs
 Political party: Etat Pied-Noir
 Status: Active (Established in 2016)

Autonomist movements

 People: Alsatians (Allemanics)
 Proposed autonomous area: 
 Political parties: Elsass Zuerst, Unser Land (EFA member)

 Brittany
 People: Bretons
 Proposed autonomous area:  Brittany
 Political party: Unvaniezh Demokratel Breizh (EFA member)

 People: Corsicans
 Proposed autonomous area: 
 Political party: Partitu di a Nazione Corsa (EFA member)

 People: French, Occitans, Italians
 Proposed autonomous area:  County of Nice
 Political party: Partit Nissart (Parti niçois (fr))

 Normandy
 People: Normans
 Proposed autonomous area:  Normandy
 Political party: Mouvement Normand

 Savoy
 People: Savoyans
 Proposed autonomous area:  Savoy
 Political party: Movement Règion Savouè (EFA member)

 People: Occitans
 Proposed autonomous area: 
 Political parties: Partit Occitan (EFA member)

Georgia 

 
Autonomous Republic of Abkhazia

 People: Abkhazians
 De facto state:  (recognized by 6 UN members)
 Political organisation: Government of Abkhazia
 Militant organisation: Abkhazian Armed Forces
 
Territory of the former South Ossetian Autonomous Oblast

 People: Ossetians
 De facto state:  (recognized by 5 UN members)
 Political organisation: Government of South Ossetia
 Militant organisation: Armed Forces of South Ossetia

Javakheti
 Ethnic group: Armenians in Samtskhe–Javakheti
 Proposed: Autonomy for the region  Javakhk (Javakheti)
 Political party: United Javakhk Democratic Alliance

Germany

  Bavaria

 People: Bavarians, Franconians, Swabians
 Proposed state or autonomous area:   Free State of Bavaria
 Political party: Bavaria Party (EFA member)

 East Frisia and  North Frisia
 People: Frisians
 Proposed autonomous area:   Frisia, unification with foreign states:  
 Political party: South Schleswig Voters' Association (EFA member) and The Frisians

Saxony
 Proposed state or autonomous area:  Saxony
 Political party:  Free Saxony

Italy

 Friuli-Venezia Giulia

 People: Friulians
 Proposed state:  Friuli
 Political parties: 
 Secessionist parties: Res Publica Furlane-Parlament Furlan, Patrie Furlane, Friulian Front, 
 Autonomist parties: Pact for Autonomy

Province of Trieste
 Proposed state:  Free Territory of Trieste
 People: Italians, Slovenes
 Political movements: Movimento Trieste Libera; Territorio Libero di Trieste, Free Territory of Trieste Movement,

 Lombardy

 Proposed state:  Republic of Lombardy
 Political parties (autonomist): Lega per l'Autonomia – Alleanza Lombarda
 Political parties (secessionist): Pro Lombardy Independence, Lega Lombarda

Northern Italy

 Proposed state:  Padania
 Political parties (autonomist): Lega Nord, Great North
 Political parties (secessionist): Lega Nord (formerly), Lega Padana, Padanian Union, Alpine Padanian Union

Southern Italy
 Proposed state:  Mezzogiorno
 Political parties (secessionist and autonomist): We the South, Great South
 Political parties (secessionist): Autonomy South, Force of the South and I the South

 Sardinia

 People: Sardinians
 Proposed state:  Republic of Sardinia
 Political parties (autonomist): Fortza Paris, Sardinian Reformers
 Political parties (secessionist): Sardinian Action Party, Sardinia Nation, Independence Republic of Sardinia, Project Republic of Sardinia, Party of Sardinians, others

 Sicily

 People: Sicilians
 Proposed state:  Sicily
 Political parties (autonomist): Sicilian Socialist Party, Party of the Sicilians
 Political parties (secessionist): Free Sicilians
 Groups: Sicilian National Front, Sicilia Nazione, Sicilian National Liberation Movement.

 South Tyrol

Proposed: independence of South Tyrol or unification with Tyrol in Austria
Political parties: Die Freiheitlichen (independence), South Tyrolean Freedom (unification)

 Tuscany
 Ethnic group: Tuscans
 Proposed: greater autonomy for  Tuscany
 Political party: Tuscan Autonomist Movement

 Veneto 

 Proposed state:  Republic of Venice
 Political parties (autonomist): Liga Veneta, Veneto for Autonomy
 Political parties (secessionist): Party of Venetians, Venetian Independence, We Are Veneto, Liga Veneta Repubblica, Venetian People's Unity, Venetian Left

Kosovo

North Kosovo/Ibar Kolašin
 People: Kosovo Serbs
 Proposed state:  Community of Serb Municipalities within  or re-unification with 
 Political organisations: Assembly of the Community of Municipalities (status unknown), Serb List

Lithuania
Samogitia
 ethnic group: Samogitians
 proposed autonomous region: Samogitia
 political party: Samogitian Party

Malta
 Gozo
 People: Gozitan
 Proposed autonomous area:  Gozo
 Political organisation: People's Party (Malta), Gozo Party (Defunct)

Moldova

Breakaway state

 Transnistria

 People: Equal proportions of Russians, Ukrainians and Moldovans
 De facto state:  Pridnestrovian Moldavian Republic
 Political organisation: Government of Transnistria
 Militant organisation: Army of Transnistria

Netherlands

 Frisia and  Groningen
 People: Frisians, West Frisians
 Proposed autonomous area:  West Frisia, or unification with foreign states :  Frisia
 Political party: Frisian National Party, (EFA member)
 Status: Democratic movement seeking greater autonomy for Frisian-speaking people in Friesland

Poland

 Silesia
 People: Silesians
 Proposed autonomous area:  Silesia
 Political party: Silesian Autonomy Movement

 Kashubia
 People: Kashubians 
 Proposed autonomous area:  Kashubia
 Political party: Kashubian Association

 Gdańsk
 Proposed autonomous area or state:  Free City of Danzig
 Political organisation: Free City of Danzig Government in Exile

Portugal 
 Lusitania
 People: Lusitanians
 Proposed autonomous area or state:  Lusitania
 Political party:

Romania
 Transylvania and  Banat

 People: Romanians, Hungarians, Transylvanian Saxons
 Proposed autonomous area or state: Transylvania or Banat
 Political organisations: Transylvania–Banat League
 Advocacy organisations: Liga Pro Europa, Provincia, Autonomy for Transylvania Székely-Hungarian National Guard, Democratic League of Transylvania (Liga Transilvania Democrată), League of Banat (Liga Bănățeană)

 Székely Land

 People: Székelys
 Proposed autonomous area: Székely Land
 Political organisations: Democratic Union of Hungarians in Romania, the demand for Hungarian autonomy has been part of their program since 1993. Hungarian Civic Party, they signed a settlement with the Democratic Union of Hungarians in Romania about cooperation and joint support for Hungarian autonomy. Hungarian People's Party of Transylvania (PPMT), the party proposes the establishments of Transylvanian parliament and government and supports the case of Székely autonomy in Székely Land. It also advocates territorial autonomy for Partium.
 Advocacy organisations: Szekler National Council

 Partium
 People: Hungarians
 Proposed autonomous area: Partium
 Advocacy organisations: Hungarian National Council of Transylvania

Russia

Ural Federal District
 Sverdlovsk Oblast
People: Russians
Proposed state:  Ural Republic
Geography: Sverdlovsk Oblast, Chelyabinsk Oblast, Kurgan Oblast, Perm Krai, Orenburg Oblast
Advocacy groups: Ural Democratic Foundation, Free Ural
Volga Federal District

 Idel-Ural
People: Bashkirs, Chuvash, Erzya, Mari, Mokshas, Russians, Tatars, Udmurts
Proposed state:  Idel-Ural Republic
Advocacy group: Free Idel-Ural.

 Mari El 
 People: Mari
 Proposed State:  Mari El
 Advocacy group:Mari Ushem, Kugeze mlande, Mari Mer Kagash, and the Association of Finno-Ugric Peoples. Mari paganists were also criticized by the Russian Orthodox Church for being separatists.

 Tatarstan
People: Tatars
Militant organisation: All-Tatar Public Center
Advocacy groups: The Union of Tatar Youth, Tatar Patriotic Front Altyn Urda, Tatar Social Center
Government in exile: Tatar Government in Exile
Organisation: Ittifaq Party
Proposed state:   Tatarstan

People: Udmurts
Proposed state: 
Movement: Congress of the Peoples of Udmurtia
Advocacy groups:Udmurt Kenesh, Udmurt National Centre, Udmurt National Progress, Odmort
Political parties: Udmurt Republican National Party, Udmurt National Progress

 Bashkortostan
People: Bashkir
Proposed state:   Bashkortostan
Advocacy groups: Bashkort Public Organization, Bashkir Human Rights Movement, Council of Aksakals of Bashkortostan, Bashkir Social Movement
Political party: The Heavenly Wolf

 Mordovia
People: Erzyas
Proposed state:  Erzyan Mastor 
 Advocacy groups: Erzya National Congress

 Chuvashia
People: Chuvash
Proposed state:   Chuvashia
Movements: Chuvash National Movement, Chuvash Republican Youth
Organisation: Chuvash Ireklekh Society of National-Cultural Rebirth
 Komi-Permyak Okrug
People: Komi and Komi-Permyaks
Proposed federal subject:  Komi-Permyak Autonomous Okrug

Northwestern Federal District
 Arkhangelsk Oblast
 People: Pomors
Proposed: establishment of a  Pomor republic

People: Komi
Proposed state:  
Political organisations: Komi Republican Organization
Advocacy movements: Komi Voityr, Finno-Ugric Peoples Consultative Committee
Organisation: Komi People's Congress

 
People: Karelians, Vepsians, Russians, Finns, Pomors
Proposed state:   Karelia, or unification with 
Political organisation: Karelian Republican Movement
Advocacy movements: Stop the Occupation of Karelia, Free Karelia, Karelian National Movement

 Kaliningrad Oblast
 People: Russian, Germans, Poles, Lithuanians, Old Prussian Descendants
 Proposed state:  Baltic Republic/Königsberg
 Political organisations: Kaliningrad Public Movement

 Leningrad Oblast

People: Russians, Izhorians, Ingrians, Votes
Proposed state: ,  Republic of Saint Petersburg
Advocacy movement: Free Ingria
Murmansk

 People: Russians
 Proposed state: Murmansk

 Astrakhan Oblast
 People: Astrakhan Tatars, Kazakhs, Kalmyks, Nogais, Russians
 Proposed state:  Astrakhan Republic,  Nogai Republic, Unification with  Kalmykia
 Advocacy movements: Free Nogai El, Oirat-Kalmyk People's Congress

 Republic of Kalmykia
People: Kalmyks
Proposed state:  Kalmykia
Advocacy group: Oirat-Kalmyk People's Congress

 Krasnodar Krai
People: Kuban Cossacks
Proposed state:  Kuban
Advocacy movements: Klin-Yar, Kuban Cossack Host,
Political parties: Lapin

 Rostov oblast
People: Don Cossacks
Proposed state:  Don Republic

 People: Crimean Tatars
 Proposed:  autonomy within unitary 
 Political organisations: Mejlis of the Crimean Tatar People, Qurultay of the Crimean Tatar People

 Pskov Republic or Krivia

 People: Russians
 Geography: Pskov Oblast
 Group: Krivian Platform
 Type of movement: Secessionist
 Representation on the Free Nations of Russia Forum: Yes

 Smalandia

 People: Russians, Belarusians
 Geography: Smolensk Oblast
 Group: Smalandia
 Type of movement: Secessionist
 Representation on the Free Nations of Russia Forum: Yes
 Years of activity: 2022 – Present

 Tver Karelia

 People: Tver Karelians
 Geography: Tver Karelia
 Group: Karelian Revival, Tver Karelia
 Type of movement: Autonomist
 Representation on the Free Nations of Russia Forum: No
 Years of activity: Present

 Veps National Volost

 People: Vepsians
 Geography: Former Veps National Volost
 Group: Karelian Congress, Veps Culture Society
 Type of movement: Autonomist
 Representation on the Free Nations of Russia Forum: No
 Years of activity: 2005 – Present

 North Russian Republic
People: Russians
 Geography: North-Western Federal District
 Group: North Russian Republic
 Type of movement: Secessionist
 Representation on the Free Nations of Russia Forum: No
 Years of activity: 2000s  – ???
Central Federal District
 Zalessian Rus’

 People: Russians
 Geography: Central Federal District
 Group: Committee of National Democrats, National Democratic Alliance 
 Type of movement: Secessionist and Autonomist
 Representation on the Free Nations of Russia Forum: No
 Years of activity: 2000s – Late 2010s
North Caucasian Federal District
 Abazinia

People: Abazins
Proposed state:  Abazinia
Geography: Abazinia, including all ethnic Abazin parts and/or districts of Karachay-Cherkessia, Stavropol Krai and Kabardino-Balkaria or solely the rural locality of Psyzh
Advocacy groups: Abaza Adkilra, Abaza Yurdu, Abzanhara, Unity (Adgylara)
 Organisation: World Congress of Abkhaz-Abazin People

People: Chechens
 Proposed state:  Chechen Republic of Ichkeria (government in exile) (Proposed to be recognized by UN member: Ukraine)
 Militant organisation: Chechen separatists
Political parties: Vainakh Democratic Party, Party of National Independence, All-National Congress of the Chechen People

  Confederation of Mountain Peoples of the Caucasus
 People: Peoples of the Caucasus
 Proposed state:   Confederation of Mountain Peoples of the Caucasus
 Geography: North Caucasian Federal District (excluding Stavropol Krai), Adyghea, Abkhazia and South Ossetia
 Militant organisation: Confederation of Mountain Peoples of the Caucasus

 Circassia
People: Circassians, Cherkesogai
Proposed state:  Circassia
Geography: Circassia, including all regions historically included in Circassia and/or inhabited by Circassians (note: this includes Adygea as well as north Kabardino-Balkaria, north Karachay–Cherkessia, south-east Krasnodar Krai, and south Stavropol Krai).
Movement: Circassian Congress; Circassian Youth Initiative; Adyge Djegi; Adyghe Khase; International Circassian Association (member of UNPO)

 Dagestan
 People: Peoples of Dagestan
 Proposed state:    Dagestan

 Ingushetia
 People: Ingush
 Proposed state:  Ingushetia

 Lezgistan
People: Lezgins
Proposed state:  Lezgistan
Geography: Lezgistan, including all ethnic Lezgin parts and/or districts of Dagestan
Movement: Lezgin Movement of Caucasian Albania
Advocacy movement: Lezgin National Center
Political party: Lezgin Patriotic Union,   Sadval movement
Organisation: Federal Lezgin National Cultural Autonomy (member of UNPO)

 North Ossetia-Alania
 People: Ossetians
 Proposed state:  Ossetia or unification with  South Ossetia and risk tensions/war with  Georgia to which the breakaway region is recognized as part of.

Karachay and  Balkaria

 People: Karachay and Balkars
 Proposed state or Autonomus area: Karachay and  Balkaria

Serbia

Image Note: Republic of Vojvodina within federalized Serbia, proposed by the League of Social Democrats of Vojvodina in 1999 – the map also includes an autonomous Sandžak, Kosovo and the metropolitan area of Belgrade as a distinctive administrative unit as well

Autonomist movements

 Vojvodina
 Proposals for Hungarian Regional Autonomy in the northern part of Vojvodina:
 People: Hungarians of Vojvodina
 Political parties: Alliance of Vojvodina Hungarians, Democratic Party of Vojvodina Hungarians, Democratic Fellowship of Vojvodina Hungarians.

 Sandžak
 People: Bosniaks of Serbia
 Proposed autonomous province:  Sandžak 
 Advocacy groups (autonomist): Party of Democratic Action of Sandžak, Islamic Community in Serbia

Breakaway state

 People: Albanians in Kosovo
 Proposed:  Republic of Kosovo, unification with 
 De facto state:  Republic of Kosovo (recognised by 50% of UN member states)
 Political organisation: Government of Kosovo
 Movement: Albanian nationalism in Kosovo

Slovakia

Autonomist movements

Southern Slovakia:
 People: Hungarians
 Proposed autonomous area: Territorial autonomy for the compact Hungarian ethnic block and cultural autonomy for the regions of Hungarian presence, or unification with 
 Political parties (autonomist): Party of the Hungarian Community, In 2010, the party renewed their demand for autonomy.

Spain

Secessionist movements

 People: Andalusian
 Proposed state:  Andalusia
 Political parties (nationalist): Bloque Andaluz de Izquierdas
 Political parties (secessionist): Nación Andaluza, Candidatura Unitaria de Trabajadores

 People: Aragonese
 Proposed state
 Socialist:   Aragon
 Federalist:  Aragon
 Political party (nationalist): Chunta Aragonesista
 Political party (secessionist): Puyalón de Cuchas, 
 Trade union: Sindicato Obrero Aragonés (SOA)

 People: Asturians
 Proposed state:  Asturias
 Political parties (autonomist): Partíu Asturianista, Unión Renovadora Asturiana
 Political parties (nationalist): Unidá, Compromisu por Asturies
 Political parties (secessionist): Andecha Astur
 Youth movements: Darréu
 Trade unions: Corriente Sindical d'Izquierda

 Basque Country (autonomous community)

 People: Basques
 Proposed state:  Basque Country (greater region) – Euskal Herria
 Political parties: Euzko Alderdi Jeltzalea (Basque Nationalist Party) (member of the European Democratic Party), Eusko Alkartasuna (EFA member), Bildu, Eusko Abertzale Ekintza (Basque Nationalist Action)
 Trade union: Euskal Langileen Alkartasuna, Langile Abertzaleen Batzordeak
 Youth advocacy groups: EGI, Gazte Abertzaleak, Haika] (illegalised) Segi, Ikasle Abertzaleak

 Castile

 People Castilians
 Proposed state:  Castile
 Political parties (autonomist): Castilian Party 
 Political parties (secessionist): Izquierda Castellana
 Youth movements: Yesca

 People: Catalans
 Proposal state:  Catalan Republic –  Catalan Countries (i.e. including other Catalan-speaking areas)
 Political parties (independentist): Republican Left of Catalonia (33/135), Together for Catalonia (32/135), Popular Unity Candidacy (9/135), supported by other small parties and civil organisations Corròp
 Political parties (autonomist): Catalunya en Comú–Podem (8/135)
 Civil organisations: Assemblea Nacional Catalana, Òmnium Cultural, Association of Municipalities for Independence, Procés Constituent, Catalunya Acció, Sobirania i Progrés, Committees for the Defense of the Republic, Negres Tempestes
 Trade unions: Intersindical-CSC, Coordinadora Obrera Sindical
 Youth advocacy groups: Arran, La Forja, Jovent Republicà, Joves d'Esquerra Verda, Joventut Nacionalista de Catalunya, Joventut Comunista de Catalunya

 Galicia

 People: Galicians
 Proposed state:  Galiza, or unification with 
 Political party: Galician Nationalist Bloc (Galician Nationalist Bloc) (souveranist) (EFA member), Anova-Nationalist Brotherhood (independentist, includes the Galician Popular Front), Compromiso por Galicia (centrist federalist), Terra Galega (Centrist autonomist), Galician Coalition (Centrist nationalist Party)
 Unions: Confederación Intersindical Galega (CIG) and Central Unitaria de Traballadores (CUT)
 Youth advocacy groups: Galiza Nova, Xeira, BRIGA and Erguer-Estudantes da Galiza (students)
 Militant organisation: Resistência Galega

 People: Navarran or Navarrese (a subgroup of Basque people)
 Proposed states: unification with the  – Euskal Herria
 Political parties: Geroa Bai, Bildu, Basque Nationalist Action, Batasuna
 Militant organisations: ETA (Euskadi Ta Askatasuna) (ceasefire since 2011)

 Valencia

 People: Valencians – Catalanics (those with Catalan ancestry)
 Proposed state:  Valencian Country or unification with  Catalan Countries
 Political parties: Valencian Nationalist Bloc, Initiative of the Valencian People, Popular Unity Candidates, Republican Left of the Valencian Country, Valencian State, Valencian Nationalist Left, Valencian Left
 Advocacy groups: Pro-Catalan Valencianists (who defend Pan-Catalanism and Fuster's theories) propose the creation of a Valencian State and some type of reconnection with the rest of Catalan-speaking areas. Only a minor tendency within anti-Catalan Valencianism (Blaverism) proposed independence of the Kingdom of Valencia from both Catalonia and Spain.
 Youth advocacy groups: Arran

Autonomist movements

Cartagena
 Proposed: extended autonomy for  Cartagena within Murcia
 Political party: Movimiento Ciudadano de Cartagena
 León
 People: Leonese
 Proposed autonomous area:  Leonese region
 Political parties: Unión del Pueblo Leonés UPL
 Youth movements: RUCHAR Mocedá Llionesa
 Aran Valley
 People: Aranese (a subset of Gascon Occitans)
 Proposed autonomous area: Aran Valley – within  or unification with 
 Political parties: Convergència Democràtica Aranesa, Unitat d'Aran, Partit Renovador d'Arties-Garòs, Esquèrra Republicana Occitana, Partit de la Nacion Occitana, Partit Occitan, Aran Amassa, Corròp

Sweden 

 Scania
 Ethnocultural people: Scanians
 Proposed state:  Scania
 Political party: Scania Party

Switzerland

Autonomist movements

 Jura region

 People: Jurassien (French-speaking) 
 Proposed autonomous area: unification of the three districts of Bernese Jura and the Laufen District with the  Canton of Jura
 Militant organisations: Mouvement Autonomiste Jurassien (Jurassian Autonomist Movement), Groupe Bélier (Youth activists movement)

 Ticino
 People: Ticinese (Italian/Lombard-speaking Swiss)
 Proposed autonomous area: unification of the Moesa Region with Ticino and stronger bonds with  Lombardy
 Political parties: Lega Sud Ticino

Ukraine 

 and 

 People: Russians in Ukraine
 De facto entity:  and  within the 
 Political organisation: State Council of Crimea, Legislative Assembly of Sevastopol
 People: Crimean Tatars
 Proposed:  autonomy or independence within unitary 
 Political organisations: Mejlis of the Crimean Tatar People, Qurultay of the Crimean Tatar People

, 
 People: Russians in Ukraine
 De facto entity: ,  (Annexed by Russia in 2022)
 Political organisations: People's Council of the Donetsk People's Republic, People's Council of the Luhansk People's Republic
 paramilitary organisation: Russian people's militias in Ukraine

Odessa People's Republic

 Proposed: unification with /
 Political organisations: Volodymyr Saldo Bloc, Derzhava, Opposition Bloc
 Military organisation: Russian Ground Forces

 Russian-occupied Zaporizhzhia Oblast,  Russian-occupied Kherson Oblast,  Russian-occupied Kharkiv Oblast
 People: Russians in Ukraine
 De facto states: Russian-occupied Kherson Oblast, Russian-occupied Zaporizhzhia Oblast Russian-occupied Kharkiv Oblast
 Proposed: unification with 
 Political organisations: Volodymyr Saldo Bloc, Derzhava, Opposition Bloc
 Military organisation: Russian Ground Forces

 Carpathian Ruthenia

 People: Russians in Ukraine, Hungarians in Ukraine,  Rusyns
 Proposed: autonomy or independence within unitary  or unification with 
 Political organisations: "Subcarpathian republican party", "Volodymyr Saldo Bloc", "Derzhava", "World Congress of Rusyns", "Opposition Bloc","Russkiy dom", "Subcarpathian Ruthenia movement" "Russkiy Mir Foundation", "Association of Zakarpattia democrats", and other pro-Russian organizations. "Rusyn separatist movement" led by the Orthodox priest Dimitry Sydor (now Archbishop of Uzhorod, in the Ukrainian Orthodox Church (Moscow Patriarchate))

United Kingdom

 

Major movements

 People: English
 Proposed state: 
 Political parties: English Democrats, English Constitution Party

Northern Ireland

 People: Irish, Northern Irish (Nationalists)
 Proposed state: Re-unification with 
 Political parties: Sinn Féin, Fianna Fáil, Éirígí, Social Democratic and Labour Party, Aontú, People Before Profit, Communist Party of Ireland, Irish Republican Socialist Party, Republican Network for Unity, Socialist Workers Network, Workers' Party of Ireland
 Militant organisations: RIRA, CIRA

 People: Scots
 Proposed state: 
 Political parties: Scottish National Party (EFA member), Scottish Greens, Scottish Socialist Party, Action for Independence, Alba, Restore Scotland, Red Party of Scotland, Scotland's Independence Referendum Party, Solidarity, Scotia Future, Independence for Scotland Party, Scottish Libertarian Party, Scottish Democratic Alliance, Siol nan Gaidheal
 Advocacy groups: Scottish Independence Convention (Common Weal, People's Voice, Scottish CND, Voice for Scotland, Women for Independence), Yes Scotland, Labour for Independence, Scottish Liberals for Independence

 People: Welsh
 Proposed state: 
 Political parties: Gwlad, Plaid Cymru, Propel, Plaid Glyndŵr
 Advocacy groups: YesCymru
Minor movements

 People: Cornish
 Proposed state: 
 Political parties: Mebyon Kernow, Cornish Nationalist Party

 People: Londoners
 Proposed state: 
 Political parties: Londependence Party

 Midlands
 People: Midlanders
 Proposed state:  Mercia
 Advocacy groups: Acting Witan of Mercia, Sovereign Mercia
 Northern England

 Proposed state: Northern England, under the name of Northumbria
 Political Parties: Northern Independence Party

Autonomist movements

Canvey Island
 People: Canvey Islanders
 Proposed autonomous area: Canvey Island
 Political Parties: Canvey Island Independent Party

 People: English
 Proposed autonomous area: 
 Political parties: English Democrats, UKIP
 Advocacy groups: Campaign for an English Parliament

 People: Scots
 Proposed autonomous area: 
 Political parties: Scottish National Party (EFA member)

 People: Welsh
 Proposed autonomous area: 
 Political parties: Plaid Cymru

 (possibly including the Isles of Scilly)

 People: Cornish
 Proposed autonomous area: 
 Political parties: Green Party of England and Wales, Mebyon Kernow (EFA member), Cornish Nationalist Party, Liberal Democrats
 Advocacy groups: Cornish Constitutional Convention, Cornwall 2000, Revived Cornish Stannary Parliament, Wessex Constitutional Convention

 People: People of Shetland
 Proposed autonomous area: 
 Advocacy group: Wir Shetland

 People: People of Yorkshire
 Proposed autonomous area: 
 Political parties: Yorkshire Party
 Advocacy group: Yorkshire Devolution Movement

 North East England
 People: People of North East England
 Proposed autonomous area: North East England
 Political parties: North East Party

 
 Ethnic group: People of Wessex
 Proposed: autonomy for Wessex
 Political party: Wessex Regionalists
 Advocacy group: Wessex Constitutional Convention

Independence movements of dependent territories

 People: Manx
 Proposed State: 
 Political party: Mec Vannin
 Advocacy group:

Autonomist movements of dependent territories

 People: Vaques
 Proposed State: 
Advocacy group: States of Alderney

See also

 Lists of active separatist movements
 List of historical separatist movements
 Unrepresented Nations and Peoples Organization
 List of micro-regional organizations
 List of states with limited recognition
 Independence referendum

References

External links
.
From Spain to Iraq, states have to see that suppressing secession won't work
Disintegration of Britain and Spain both possible

Separatist Movements, Active, List Of
Separatist Movements, Active
Europe
 
Separatist Movements in Europe, Active